Air Astana Flight 1388 was a repositioning flight from Lisbon to Almaty, with a refueling stopover at Minsk. On 11 November 2018, shortly after takeoff it suffered severe control issues. After 90 minutes it landed safely at Beja Airbase, with no fatalities.

Aircraft and crew
P4-KCJ, the incident aircraft, was an Embraer ERJ-190LR operated by Air Astana of Kazakhstan. The aircraft was delivered from Embraer to the airline in December 2013. Prior to the incident it had accumulated a total of 13,152 flight hours.

The plane was flown by Captain Vyacheslav Aushev (40); First officer Bauyrzhan Karasholakov (32); and First officer in jumpseat Sergey Sokolov (26). Three engineers travelled as passengers.

Maintenance
On 2 October 2018 the aircraft arrived at Alverca Air Base to undergo heavy maintenance at an OGMA maintenance facility. The maintenance consisted of accomplishing several service bulletins. On 9 October the overhaul of aileron cables was initiated. The first service bulletin consisted of replacing pulleys and structural supports of the cables. The second one consisted of replacing the stainless steel cables with carbon steel cables. The cables were also lubricated.

On October 26 during operational tests, a warning message (FLT CTR NO DISPATCH) alerted the maintenance crew that the aircraft was unfit for flight due to control system problems. The warning occurred again on 31 October. The troubleshooting lasted until 11 November, the date of the incident.

Flight
The aircraft took off at 13:31, with the crew failing to detect the ailerons' anomaly during the operational check procedures. Shortly after take-off the pilots noticed severe control issues. The pilots tried to turn on the autopilot, but it failed to engage. At 13:37 the crew requested a climb to FL100 (about ) and an immediate return to Alverca, reporting flight control problems. At several instances the plane suffered complete loss of control, flipping over and diving sharply, placing stress on the airframe. The crew requested a heading to the sea so they could ditch if it became inevitable, but struggled to comply with any headings given by ATC due to their difficulty controlling the aircraft.

The crew discussed the options available to them, with the first officer in the jumpseat coordinating with the technicians on board as passengers to discover the cause of the upsets and establish an action plan. Despite no warnings indicating issues with normal mode, the crew activated the direct mode for flight controls which disconnects the FCM (flight control module) from the controls. This considerably increased controllability of the pitch and yaw-axes, but control of the roll axis was still limited with the plane rolling abnormally as the spoilers would actuate and upset the aircraft with too much input. The crew flew the plane east, hoping to find better weather conditions. Two F-16s from the Portuguese Air Force took off from Monte Real Air Base to escort the aircraft to Beja Airbase. After two go-arounds due to unstable approaches, the active  first officer changed places with the other one in the jumpseat. On the final approach, the plane was bound for runway 19R but eventually landed on 19L due to the aircraft drifting on the approach. A footage shows the aircraft nearly skidded off the runway after touching down on the runway.

All on board were shaken, but the only injury was one passenger who suffered a leg injury. The hull was deformed and the leading edges of the wing were wrinkled. Some parts of the aircraft suffered loads greater than they were designed for. The aircraft was written off and subsequently scrapped.

Investigation
The investigation revealed that the aileron cables were installed incorrectly. This caused reversal of aileron controls. Since the roll control surfaces include spoilers, which weren't affected by the mistake, the situation couldn't have been handled with just reversing inputs.

The investigation blamed the manufacturer of the airplane for unsatisfactory maintenance instructions, the supervising authorities for lack of oversight over the maintenance crew, who lacked the skill to perform the heavy maintenance, and the flight crew for failing to notice the condition during pre-flight control checks.

In popular culture 
The incident was featured in season 23, episode 5 of the Canadian documentary series Mayday, titled "Control Catastrophe".

See also

China Northwest Airlines Flight 2303
China Airlines Flight 006 - another flight that suffered loss of control and immense G-forces
Forced landing of a German Air Force Bombardier Global 5000 with partly reversed flight controls

References

External links
 
  — iMdb

Aviation accidents and incidents in 2018
Aviation accidents and incidents caused by loss of control
Aviation accidents and incidents involving the Embraer E-Jet family
Aviation accidents and incidents in Portugal
Airliner accidents and incidents caused by maintenance errors
2018 disasters in Portugal
November 2018 events in Europe